This is a list of seasons completed by the Washington Wizards, a professional basketball team based in Washington, D.C. The Wizards are a member of the National Basketball Association (NBA), and currently play their home games at the Capital One Arena, in the Chinatown neighborhood of Washington, D.C.

Table key

Seasons

All-time records
Note: Statistics are correct as of the conclusion of the 2020–21 NBA season.

Notes

References

 
Seasons
Events in Washington, D.C.